Ludger Sylbaris (1 June 1874 –  1929, aged 55) was an Afro-Caribbean man who was one of the survivors in the city of Saint-Pierre on the Caribbean island of Martinique during the 1902 eruption of Mount Pelée on May 8, 1902. Saint-Pierre, known as the "Paris of the West Indies", was in the direct path of a pyroclastic flow, which destroyed the city and killed an estimated 30,000 people.

Sylbaris later travelled with the Barnum & Bailey circus and became something of an early 20th-century celebrity.

Saint-Pierre and the eruption

It is commonly believed that his birth name was either August Cyparis or Louis-Auguste Cyparis, but his actual birth record contradicts this interpretation. Sylbaris worked as a common labourer in the capital city, Saint-Pierre, in the shadow of the volcano Mount Pelée.

On the night of 7 May 1902, the night before the eruption, Sylbaris got involved in either a bar fight or a street brawl, according to various sources, and was thrown into jail overnight for assault. Some accounts claim that Sylbaris actually killed a man and was thrown into jail for murder, although it is unknown if this is the correct version of events. Many sources indicate Sylbaris was frequently in trouble with the authorities. Some fictional accounts state that he had a precognitive dream and was locked up as a drunk after causing a riot.

Whatever the cause of his arrest, Sylbaris was ordered to be put into solitary confinement and locked in a single-cell, bomb-proof magazine with stone walls that was built partially underground. The cell did not have windows and was ventilated only through a narrow grating in the door facing away from the volcano. His prison was the most sheltered building in the city, and this saved his life. The cell in which he survived still stands today.

At 7:52 AM on May 8, the upper mountainside of Mount Pelée tore open, causing a dense black cloud to shoot out horizontally. A second black cloud rolled upwards as a column of ash and rock, forming a gigantic mushroom plume that darkened the sky within a  radius. The vertical cloud plunged down the western slope of the volcano, raced down at 161 kilometers per hour, and destroyed Saint-Pierre in less than a minute. All of the city's infrastructure was flattened, and almost the entire population burned or suffocated.

Four days after the eruption, a rescue team heard Sylbaris' cries from the rubble of the prison. Although badly burned, he survived and was able to provide an account of the event. According to his account, at about breakfast time on the day of the eruption, it grew very dark. Hot air mixed with fine ashes entered his cell through the door grating, despite his efforts in urinating on his clothing and stuffing it in the door. The heat lasted only a short moment, enough to cause deep burns on Sylbaris' hands, arms, legs, and back, but his clothes did not ignite, and he avoided breathing the searing hot air.

Later life

Sylbaris was pardoned for his crimes and later joined Barnum & Bailey's circus, touring America and recounting the horrors of the explosion. He became a minor celebrity in the process, advertised as "the man who lived through Doomsday" or "the Most Marvelous Man in the World". He was the first black man ever to star in Barnum and Bailey's "Greatest Show on Earth", which at the time was a segregated show. He could be seen in a replica of his cell in Saint-Pierre.

Sylbaris died of natural causes in 1929.

References

External links

 Barnum and Bailey Poster
 Mt. Pelée Eruption (1902)
 Thinkquest.org article

Martiniquais criminals
Sole survivors
Recipients of French presidential pardons
1874 births
1929 deaths